The 2005–06 National Division Two was the sixth version (nineteenth overall) of the third division of the English rugby union league system using the name National Division Two.  New teams to the division included Henley Hawks and Orrell who were relegated from the 2004–05 National Division One, Halifax who were promoted from the 2004–05 National Division Three North as well as Barking (champions) and Redruth (runners up) who were promoted from the 2004–05 National Division Three South.  Only one team would be relegated at the end of this season (instead of the usual three).

By the end of the season Moseley were league champions beating Waterloo to first place by just 2 points, with both sides being promoted to the 2006–07 National Division One.  Orrell finished as the league's bottom side behind 13th place Harrogate and were relegated to the 2006–07 National Division Three North, making it two consecutive relegations for the Wigan based club.

Participating teams and locations

Final league table

Results

Round 1

Round 2

Round 3

Round 4

Round 5

Round 6

Round 7

Round 8

Round 9 

Postponed.  Game rescheduled to 25 February 2006.

Round 10 

Postponed.  Game rescheduled to 4 February 2006.

Postponed.  Game rescheduled to 4 February 2006.

Postponed.  Game rescheduled to 4 February 2006.

Postponed.  Game rescheduled to 4 February 2006.

Round 11

Round 12

Round 13

Round 14

Round 15

Round 16

Round 17

Round 10 (rescheduled games) 

Game rescheduled from 26 November 2005.

Game rescheduled from 26 November 2005.

Game rescheduled from 26 November 2005.

Game rescheduled from 26 November 2005.

Round 18 

Postponed.  Game rescheduled to 11 March 2006.

Round 19

Round 9 (rescheduled game) 

Game rescheduled from 19 November 2005.

Round 20 

Postponed.  Game rescheduled to 11 March 2006.

Rounds 18 & 20 (rescheduled games) 

Game rescheduled from 4 March 2006.

Game rescheduled from 11 February 2006.

Round 21

Round 22

Round 23

Round 24

Round 25

Round 26

Total season attendances

Individual statistics 

 Note that points scorers includes tries as well as conversions, penalties and drop goals.

Top points scorers

Top try scorers

Season records

Team
Largest home win — 53 pts
59 - 6 Esher at home to Halifax on 28 January 2006
Largest away win — 40 pts
43 - 3 Waterloo away to Stourbridge on 29 October 2005
Most points scored — 59 pts
59 - 6 Esher at home to Halifax on 28 January 2006
Most tries in a match — 9
Esher at home to Halifax on 28 January 2006
Most conversions in a match — 7
Esher at home to Halifax on 28 January 2006
Most penalties in a match — 8 (x2)
Barking at home to Manchester on 17 September 2005
Launceston at home to Blackheath on 21 January 2006
Most drop goals in a match — 2
Henley Hawks at home to Barking on 11 February 2006

Player
Most points in a match — 26 (x2)
 Corrado Pilat for Barking at home to Manchester on 17 September 2005
 Stuart Alred for Launceston at home to Blackheath on 21 January 2006
Most tries in a match — 4 (x2)
 Felise Ah-Ling for Barking at home to Launceston on 3 September 2005
 Nathan Bressington for Moseley away to Harrogate on 18 February 2006
Most conversions in a match — 7
 Matthew Leek for Esher at home to Halifax on 28 January 2006
Most penalties in a match —  8 (x2)
 Corrado Pilat for Barking at home to Manchester on 17 September 2005
 Stuart Alred for Launceston at home to Blackheath on 21 January 2006
Most drop goals in a match —  1
N/A - multiple players

Attendances
Highest — 1,759 
Redruth at home to Launceston on 18 March 2006
Lowest — 100 
Barking at home to Wharfedale on 3 December 2005
Highest Average Attendance — 868
Redruth
Lowest Average Attendance — 207		
Barking

See also
 English Rugby Union Leagues
 English rugby union system
 Rugby union in England

References

External links
 NCA Rugby

National
National League 1 seasons